Jimingsi station, is interchange station between Line 3 and Line 4 of the Nanjing Metro. It is named after Jiming Temple and also serves the Nanjing city government headquarters. It started operations on Line 3 on 1 April 2015, while the interchange with Line 4 opened along with the opening of that line on 18 January 2017.

References

Railway stations in Jiangsu
Railway stations in China opened in 2015
Nanjing Metro stations